Transportation in South Korea is provided by extensive networks of railways, highways, bus routes, ferry services and air routes that traverse the country. South Korea is the third country in the world to operate a maglev train, which is an automatically run people mover at Incheon International Airport.

History
Development of modern infrastructure began with the first Five-Year Development Plan (1962–66), which included the construction of 275 kilometers of railways and several small highway projects. Construction of the Gyeongbu Expressway, which connects the two major cities of Seoul and Busan, was completed on 7 July 1970.

The 1970s saw increased commitment to infrastructure investments. The third Five-Year Development Plan (1972–76) added the development of airports, seaports. The Subway system was built in Seoul, the highway network was expanded by 487 km and major port projects were started in Pohang, Ulsan, Masan, Incheon and Busan.

The railroad network experienced improvements in the 1980s with electrification and additional track projects. Operation speed was also increased on the main lines. Though the railroad was still more useful for transportation of freight, passenger traffic was also growing. There was 51,000 kilometers of roadways by 1988. Expressway network was expanded to connect more major cities and reached a combined length of 1,539 kilometers before the end of the decade.

Rail

The largest railway operator is Korail. Railway network is managed by Korea Rail Network Authority.

Korea Train Express began service in April 2004 as Korea's first high-speed service. Intercity services are provided by ITX-Saemaeul and Mugunghwa-ho. ITX-Saemaeul generally stops less than Mugunghwa-ho. They stop in all stations and seat reservation is not available. On routes where KTX operates, air travel significantly declined with fewer passengers choosing to fly and airlines offering fewer flights.

Nuriro Train service runs between Seoul-Sinchang route and other lines. Nuriro Train serves commuters around Seoul Metropolitan Area, providing shorter travel time than Seoul Subway. The rapid trains have same cost and seat reservation as Mugunghwa-ho. Korail plans to expand the service area. (Stopped its service)

Subways

South Korea's six largest cities — Seoul, Busan, Daegu, Gwangju, Daejeon and Incheon — all have subway systems.

Seoul's subway system is the oldest system in the country, with the Seoul Station – Cheongnyangni section of Line 1 opening in 1974.

Trams
The first tram line in Seoul started operation between Seodaemun and Cheongnyangni in December 1898. The network was expanded to cover the whole downtown area (Jung-gu and Jongno-gu districts) as well as surrounding neighbourhoods, including Cheongnyangni in the east, Mapo-gu in the west, and Noryangjin across the Han River to the south.

The networks reached its peak in 1941, but was abandoned in favor of cars and the development of a subway system in 1968. Seoul Subway Line 1 and Line 2 follow the old streetcar routes along Jongno and Euljiro, respectively.

Buses

Regional services

Virtually all towns in South Korea of all sizes are served by regional bus service. Regional routes are classified as gosok bus (고속버스, "high speed" express bus) or sioe bus (시외버스, "suburban" intercity bus) with gosok buses operating over the longer distances and making the fewest (if any) stops en route.  Shioe buses typically operate over shorter distances, are somewhat slower, and make more stops. It is possible to reach another city by intercity buses. From Seoul, the place is Express Bus Terminal, the subway station is served by Seoul Subway Lines 3, 7 and 9.

Local services

Within cities and towns, two types of city bus operate in general: jwaseok (좌석, "coach") and dosihyeong (도시형, "city type") or ipseok (입석, "standing"). Both types of bus often serve the same routes, make the same (or fewer) stops and operate on similar frequencies, but jwaseok buses are more expensive and offer comfortable seating, while doshihyeong buses are cheaper and have fewer and less comfortable seats. Many small cities and towns do not have jwaseok buses and their buses are officially called nongeochon (농어촌, "rural area" bus). The local buses in Seoul and other cities work by colours: the blue buses cross the entire city, the green ones mean that some of their stops are close to a subway station, and the red buses go out of the city.

Some cities have their own bus classifying systems.

Other services

Incheon International Airport is served by an extensive network of high-speed buses from all parts of the country.

Beginning in the late 1990s, many department stores operated their own small networks of free buses for shoppers, but government regulation, confirmed by a court decision on June 28, 2001, have banned department stores from operating buses. However, most churches, daycare centres and private schools send buses around to pick up their congregants, patients or pupils.

Roads

Highways in South Korea are classified as freeways (expressways/motorways), national roads and various classifications below the national level. Almost all freeways are toll highways and most of the expressways are built, maintained and operated by Korea Expressway Corporation (KEC).

The freeway network serves most parts of South Korea. Tolls are collected using an electronic toll collection system. KEC also operates service amenities (dining and service facilities) en route.

There are also several privately financed toll roads. Nonsan-Cheonan Expressway, Daegu-Busan Expressway, Incheon International Airport Expressway, Seoul-Chuncheon Expressway and parts of the Seoul Ring Expressway are wholly privately funded and operated BOT concessions. Donghae Expressway was built in cooperation between KEC and the National Pension Service.

Total length of the South Korean road network was 86,989 km in 1998. Of this, 1,996 km was expressways and 12,447 km national roads. By 2009, combined length of the expressways had reached approximately 3,000 km, it mostly equal to the whole area of South Korea

Waterways
Virtually cut off from the Asian mainland, South Korea is a seafaring nation, with one of the world's largest shipbuilding industries and an extensive system of ferry services. South Korea operates one of the largest merchant fleets serving China, Japan and the Middle East. Most fleet operators are large conglomerates, while most ferry operators are small, private operators.

There are 1,609 km of navigable waterways in South Korea, though use is restricted to small craft.

Ferries

The southern and westerns coasts of the country are dotted with small islands which are served by ferries.  In addition, the larger offshore Jeju and Ulleung Islands are also served by ferry. Major centres for ferry service include Incheon, Mokpo, Pohang and Busan, as well as China and Japan.

Ports and harbours
The cities have major ports Jinhae, Incheon, Gunsan, Masan, Mokpo, Pohang, Busan ( Busan Port), Donghae, Ulsan, Yeosu, Jeju.

Merchant Marine
In 1999, there was a total of 461 merchant ships (1,000 GT or over) totalling 5,093,620 GT/. These are divisible by type as follows:
 bulk 98
 cargo 149
 chemical tanker 39
 combination bulk 4
 container 53
 liquefied gas 13
 multi-functional large load carrier 1
 passenger 3
 petroleum tanker 61
 refrigerated cargo 26
 roll-on/roll-off 4
 specialised tanker 4
 vehicle carrier 6

Air travel

Korean Air was founded by the government in 1962 to replace Korean National Airlines and has been privately owned since 1969. It was South Korea's sole airline until 1988. In 2008, Korean Air served 2,164 million passengers, including 1,249 million international passengers.

A second carrier, Asiana Airlines, was established in 1988 and originally served Seoul, Jeju and Busan domestically and Bangkok, Singapore, Japan and Los Angeles internationally. By 2006, Asiana served 12 domestic cities, 66 cities in 20 foreign countries for commercial traffic and 24 cities in 17 countries for cargo traffic.

Combined, South Korean airlines currently serve 297 international routes. Smaller airliners, such as Air Busan, Jin Air, Eastar Jet and Jeju Air, provide domestic service and Japan/Southeast Asian route with lower fares.

South Korea contains the busiest passenger air corridor as measured by passengers per year.  Over ten million people traveled between Seoul Gimpo Airport and Jeju in 2015 alone. As competition is fierce and prices affordable, the trend has been increasingly towards more air travel on this route. Similarly, air travel is also growing between Jeju and other mainland airports. There is discussion about a Jeju Undersea Tunnel which would make many of these domestic flights redundant.

Along other routes, air travel competes with the KTX high speed rail service and has declined in the 2000s and 2010s.

Airports

Construction of South Korea's largest airport, Incheon International Airport, was completed in 2001, in time for the 2002 FIFA World Cup. By 2007, the airport was serving 30 million passengers a year. The airport has been selected as the "Best Airport Worldwide" for four consecutive years since 2005 by Airports Council International.

Seoul is also served by Gimpo International Airport (formerly Kimpo International Airport).  International routes mainly serve Incheon, while domestic services mainly use Gimpo.  Other major airports are in Busan and Jeju.

There are 103 airports in South Korea (1999 est.) and these may be classified as follows.

Airports with paved runways:
total:
67
over 3,047 m:
1
2,438 to 3,047 m:
18
1,524 to 2,437 m:
15
914 to 1,523 m:
13
under 914 m:
20 (1999 est.)

Airports with unpaved runways:
total:
36
over 3,047 m:
1
914 to 1,523 m:
3
under 914 m:
32 (1999 est.)

Heliports:
203 (1999 est.)

Pipelines 
 South–North Pipeline Korea
 Trans Korea Pipeline
These pipelines are for petroleum products.
Additionally, there is a parallel petroleum, oils and lubricants (POL) pipeline being completed

See also 

 Transportation in North Korea
 The Korea Transport Institute
 Plug-in electric vehicles in South Korea

References

External links 

 Korea Expressway Corporation
 Freeway system map
 Korean Air
 Asiana Airlines
 Incheon International Airport
 Gimpo International Airport